The BYU Cougars men's ice hockey team represents Brigham Young University (BYU) in the Mountain West Collegiate Hockey League within Division 2 of the American Collegiate Hockey Association (ACHA).

The BYU Cougars Hockey Team began in 1996 as the Provo IceCats, and ice hockey had been a part of Brigham Young University for many years prior, but at the beginning of the 2007–08 season, the Provo IceCats – a club team composed of Brigham Young students which had been around since at least 1970 – finally gained recognition as an official extramural sport at BYU. Upon being officially recognized, the Cougars hockey team began representing their school by wearing the BYU logo on their uniforms and in their advertising. Although the team is officially recognized and sponsored by the university, it is funded entirely through player fees, the contributions of private donors, ticket proceeds, and various forms of advertising.

Record as BYU Affiliated Team

̽ Covid-19 Pandemic restricted season

Venue 
Peaks Ice Arena is the home venue for the BYU Cougars.  It has two ice sheets and was an Olympic Venue for the 2002 Winter Olympics. The team maintains a locker room at Peaks for the exclusive use of the coaches and players. The venue has a seating capacity of 2,300.

Conference 
The Cougars have been members of the Mountain West Collegiate Hockey League since its inception in 2013. They were runners up to the Championship in 2018 and won the Championship in 2019.

References

BYU Cougars
College men's ice hockey teams in the United States
1966 establishments in Utah
Ice hockey clubs established in 1966